Pierre Canivet (22 May 1890 – 25 January 1982) was a French curler and tennis player. He was born in Paris. He won a bronze medal with the French curling team at the 1924 Winter Olympics in Chamonix.

References

External links

1890 births
1982 deaths
French male curlers
Olympic curlers of France
Olympic bronze medalists for France
Curlers at the 1924 Winter Olympics
Medalists at the 1924 Winter Olympics
French male tennis players
Sportspeople from Paris